Psychedelic Psoul is an album by the American psychedelic rock band The Freak Scene (better known as The Deep), and released on Columbia Records in 1967 (see 1967 in music). After the release of the pioneering album, Psychedelic Moods, a year prior, lead member Rusty Evans reassembled the studio-only group to expand on the aspects of the previous effort. Among the material, the band included abnormal sound effects, fuzz guitar motifs, and utilization of tape manipulation, which was most relevant on the instrumental piece, "Grok!". In addition, Psychedelic Psoul incorporated Middle eastern influences, most notably in the tracks "A Million Grains of Sand,” “Rose of Smiling Faces” and “My Rainbow Life", all of which Evans first experimented with while recording the New York rock outfit, The Third Bardo.

Psychedelic Psoul was released in 1967 on Columbia Records. Since The Freak Scene was one of the few psychedelic musical acts on the label, the release received much more exposure than its predecessor, but, as a consequence of the band not touring to promote it, the album failed to chart. After the album, the group disbanded and Evans went on to produce a psychedelic folk piece in 1969, under the alias, Marcus. In 2008, Psychedelic Psoul was released on compact disc by P-Vine Records.

Track listing

"A Million Grains of Sand - 2:39	
"...When in the Course of Human Events (Draft Beer, Not Students)" - 1:50	
"Interpolitation: We Shall Overcome" - 1:44	
"Rose of Smiling Faces" - 4:16	
"Behind the Mind" - 2:18
"The Subway Ride Thru Inner Space" - 2:43	
"Butterfly Dream"	- 1:38
"My Rainbow Life"	 - 2:51
"The Center of My Soul" - 2:26	
"Watered Down Soul" - 2:37	
"Red Roses Will Weep" - 2:20	
"Mind Bender" - 2:28	
"Grok!" - 1:31

Personnel

Note: The personnel have been identified, but no source confirms all of their roles in the album.

 Rusty Evans - lead vocals, lead guitar
 David Bromberg - rhythm guitar, bass guitar, backing vocals
 Mark Barkan - percussion, backing vocals
 David Richard Blackhurst
 Caroline Blue
 Arthur Geller
Lenny Pogan

References

1967 albums
The Deep (band) albums